A missing sock, lost sock, or odd sock (primarily British English) is a single sock in a pair of socks known or perceived to be permanently or temporarily missing. Socks are usually perceived to be lost immediately before, during, or immediately after doing laundry.

According to popular media articles regarding missing socks, people almost always report losing one sock in a pair, and hardly ever the entire pair of two socks. Various explanations or theories—some scientific or pseudo-scientific and others humorous or facetious—have been proposed to show how or why single socks go missing or are perceived to have gone missing.

The terms odd sock or mismatched sock may refer to the remaining "orphaned" sock in a pair where the other matching sock is missing or lost.

Possible causes and explanations
Two common plausible explanations for missing socks are that they are lost in transit to or from the laundry, or that they are trapped inside, between, or behind components of ("eaten by") washing machines and/or clothes dryers. Due to the high rotational speeds of modern front-loading washing machines and dryers, it may be possible for small clothes items such as socks to slip through any holes or tears in the rubber gasket between either machine's spinning drums and their outer metal or plastic cases. Socks may also bunch up or unravel and get caught in the water drain pipe of washing machines or in the lint trap of dryers.

Some explanations for missing socks seem to imply socks' propensity for going missing is—or is related to—a physical property of the universe. For example, in the 1996  book The Nature of Space and Time by physicist Stephen Hawking and mathematician Roger Penrose, they posited spontaneous black holes are responsible for lost socks.

In 2008, American science educator and writer George B. Johnson proposed six hypotheses for why socks go missing, some plausible and others fanciful:

 an "intrinsic property" of the socks themselves predisposes or causes them to go missing;
 the socks transform into something else, such as clothes hangers;
 during the drying cycle, socks are caught inside other clothing such as trousers or long-sleeved shirts due to static cling;
 socks are lost somewhere in the home or elsewhere while being transported to or from the laundry;
 socks are lost during washing, getting stuck inside components of the washing machine; or;
 socks are lost during drying, getting stuck inside components of the dryer.

In his particular case, Johnson rejected hypotheses 1 through 5 but was not able to reject hypothesis 6, as it was possible for small items like socks to slip behind the dryer's spinning drum because of gaps between the drum and the dryer's outer metal case.

A 2016 pseudo-scientific consumer study commissioned by Samsung Electronics UK (to advertise their new washing machines where users could add more laundry to a load one piece at a time) referenced multiple human errors—including errors of human perception or psychology—to explain why socks go missing: they may become mismatched by poor folding and sorting of laundry, be intentionally misplaced or stolen, fall in hard-to-reach or hard-to-see spaces behind furniture or radiators, or blow off of clothes lines in high wind. Diffusion of responsibility, poor heuristics, and confirmation bias were the cited psychological reasons. For example: people may not search for lost socks because they assume others are searching; people search for lost socks in the likeliest places they could have been lost but not in the places where they are actually lost; or people may believe socks are or are not lost because they want to believe so despite evidence to the contrary, respectively.

The authors of the Samsung study developed an equation called the "sock loss formula" or "sock loss index" which claims to predict the frequency of sock loss for a given individual: , where  equals laundry size (number of people in a household multiplied by the number of weekly laundry loads),  equals "washing complexity" (the number of types of laundry loads such as dark clothes versus white clothes done in a week multiplied by the total number of socks in those loads),  equals the positive or negative attitude of the individual toward doing laundry on a scale of 1 (most negative) to 5 (most positive), and  equals the "degree of attention" the individual has when doing laundry (the sum of whether the individual checks pockets, unrolls sleeves, turns clothes the right way if they have been turned inside out, and unrolls socks).

Prevention
Sock clips are small plastic clips similar to clothespins produced by the American company RIHCO designed to keep pairs of matching socks together and avoid their being lost. Regular plastic clothespins may be used for the same purpose, as long as they will not be damaged by the moisture or high heat of washing machines and dryers.

Home appliance repair and design specialists from Sears and GE suggest not overloading laundry machines and repairing any holes in the gaskets between the spinning drums and the rest of the machines to avoid losing socks in them.

In popular culture

The Bobs' 1988 song "Where Does the Wayward Footwear Go?", asks where lost socks disappear to, asking "To the bottom of the ocean? Or to China? Or to Cuba? Or Aruba?". A 1993 album by the American indie rock band Grifters is titled One Sock Missing. In the 2001 American children's film Halloweentown II: Kalabar's Revenge, lost objects including socks are magically transported to the home of a character named Gort, who is a compulsive hoarder. 

American illustrator and voice actor Harry S. Robins wrote and illustrated a book titled The Meaning of Lost and Mismatched Socks. In the British children's book series Oddies, odd socks are transported to a planet called Oddieworld by a magical washing machine.

The online sock subscription service and retailer Blacksocks was supposedly started after its founder wore mismatched socks to a Japanese tea ceremony.

See also
Abductive reasoning
Effort heuristic
Guesstimate
Smelly socks
Spherical cow
Viral phenomenon

References

Laundry
Socks
Social phenomena
Heuristics